Afşar Dam is a dam in Manisa Province, Turkey, built between 1973 and 1977. The dam creates a lake which is 5.25 km ² and irrigates 13,500 hectares.

See also
List of dams and reservoirs in Turkey

References

Dams in Manisa Province
Dams completed in 1977